Mimasyngenes is a genus of longhorn beetles of the subfamily Lamiinae, containing the following species:

 Mimasyngenes icuapara Galileo & Martins, 1996
 Mimasyngenes inlineatus Breuning, 1956
 Mimasyngenes lepidotus Clarke, 2007
 Mimasyngenes lineatipennis Breuning, 1950
 Mimasyngenes lucianae Galileo & Martins, 2003
 Mimasyngenes multisetosus Clarke, 2007
 Mimasyngenes murutinga Martins & Galileo, 2006
 Mimasyngenes quiuira Galileo & Martins, 1996
 Mimasyngenes venezuelensis Breuning, 1956
 Mimasyngenes ytu Galileo & Martins, 1996

References

Desmiphorini